Manuel may refer to:

People 
 Manuel (name)
 Manuel (Fawlty Towers), a fictional character from the sitcom Fawlty Towers
 Charlie Manuel, manager of the Philadelphia Phillies
  Manuel I Komnenos, emperor of the Byzantine Empire
  Manuel I of Portugal, king of Portugal

Places 
Manuel, Valencia, a municipality in the province of Valencia, Spain
Manuel Junction, railway station near Falkirk, Scotland

Other 
 Manuel (American horse), a thoroughbred racehorse
 Manuel (Australian horse), a thoroughbred racehorse
Manuel and The Music of The Mountains, a musical ensemble
Manuel (album), music album by Dalida, 1974

See also 
Manny, a common nickname for those named Manuel